Thottupaar is an Indian Tamil action film written and directed by newcomer K. V. Nandhu and produced by Janaki Sivakumar. The film, which starred Vidharth, Ramana and Lakshana in leading roles, released on 15 October 2010.

Cast
Vidharth as Maharaja
Ramana as Lingam
Lakshana as Kanimozhi
Cochin Haneefa
Jagan
Dinesh Lamba
Azhagam Perumal
Anu Haasan
Manobala
Mayilsamy
Ragasya as item number

Production
Actor Vidharth played the lead role for the first time in his career, though the failure of the film meant that Mynaa (2010) is often noted as his debut film. The film's director Nandhu, had previously apprenticed under director Perarasu.

Release
The film opened to poor reviews, with a critic from Sify.com labelling the film as a "big bore", adding that "the film lacks a cohesive narration and screenplay". Another reviewer cited that the film was a "can't watch".

Soundtrack
Music is composed by Srikanth Deva. Soundtrack contains 5 songs including a remix version of "Aadi Maasam Kaathadikka" from Rajinikanth starrer Paayum Puli.

References

External links
 

2010 films
2010s Tamil-language films
Films scored by Srikanth Deva